South Richmond is an unincorporated community in Wayne Township, Wayne County, in the U.S. state of Indiana.

Geography

References

Unincorporated communities in Wayne County, Indiana
Unincorporated communities in Indiana